The 22131 / 22132 Pune–Banaras Gyan Ganga Express, are the express trains which connect Pune Junction (Pune, Maharashtra, India) and Banaras railway station (Varanasi, Uttar Pradesh, India). During its travel it covers a distance of 1537 km, for that it takes 27 hrs 5 mins. It runs with an average speed of 56 km/h.  During its journey it covers 17 halts and passes 192 intermediate stations.

Coaches

The train has standard ICF rakes with Max Permissible Speed of 110 km/h. (avg speed: 55 km/h)

 1 AC I Tier 
 3 AC III Tier
 13 Sleeper coaches
 2 General
 2 Second-class Luggage/parcel van
 1 PC

Schedule

Runs only one day from either side.

Route & Halts

Reversals
The train reverses its direction 2 times at;

 DD – 
 PRYJ –

Loco link

1. Banaras to Katni;

Itarsi-based WDP-4D diesel locomotive.

2. Katni]] to Pune;

Itarsi-based WAP-4 electric locomotive.

RSA – Rake sharing

11037/11038 – Pune–Gorakhpur Express

Features

Initially it uses train No. 22131 for its journey from Pune Junction to Banaras, and train no. 22132 for its journey from Banaras to Pune Junction.

On 3 August 2011 the train numbers for Gyan Ganga Express changed to #22131 for Train #11031 and to 22132 from Train #11032.

References

Transport in Pune
Passenger trains originating from Varanasi
Express trains in India
Rail transport in Maharashtra
Rail transport in Madhya Pradesh